Liu Fangyi (born January 1, 1983, in Qiqihar) is a Chinese male speed skater.

He competed for China at the 2010 Winter Olympics in the 500m event.

References

1983 births
Living people
Sportspeople from Qiqihar
Chinese male speed skaters
Olympic speed skaters of China
Speed skaters at the 2010 Winter Olympics